BOY is the first single Shion Miyawaki released under label Rhythm Zone. This single charted on the Oricon ranking on the #182 place and sold 507 copies in its first week.

Track listing

CD 
 BOY
 Bluff
 BOY (instrumental)
 Bluff (instrumental)

DVD 
 BOY PV
 BOY Making Clip
 ザ・ライバルTV Promotion Clip

Charts

Total Reported Sales: 507

References

2007 singles
2007 songs
Rhythm Zone singles